Harrisville is a neighbourhood in Moncton, New Brunswick. It is notable for being in the vicinity of the Greater Moncton International Airport.

History
See History of Moncton and Timeline of Moncton history

Harrisville Shopping Area

Bordering communities

See also

List of neighbourhoods in Moncton
List of neighbourhoods in New Brunswick

References

Power centres (retail) in Canada
Neighbourhoods in Moncton